

North Sea Region Programme 2007–2013 (Interreg IVB) 
The North Sea Region Programme 2007–2013 supports transnational regional development projects connecting regions from seven countries around the North Sea. It is part of the European Territorial Cooperation Objective under the European Regional Development Fund (ERDF) initiated by the European Union and the European Commission. The aim of the North Sea Region Programme is "to make the North Sea Region a better place to live, work and invest in".

Cooperation area 
The eligible co-operation area comprises the whole of Norway and Denmark, the eastern counties of the UK, three provinces of the Flemish Region of Belgium, the north western regions of Germany, the northern and western parts of the Netherlands as well as the south western regions of Sweden. The Joint Technical Secretariat administering the Programme is located in Viborg, Denmark.

Strategic focus 
The North Sea Region Programme 2007–2013 supports transnational regional development projects along four priorities. For each priority there are a number of areas of intervention.

Priorities:
 Building on our capacity for innovation
 Promoting the sustainable management of our environment
 Improving the accessibility of places in the North Sea Region
 Promoting sustainable and competitive communities

North Sea Programme 2000–2006 (Interreg IIIB) 
The IIIB North Sea Programme was the predecessor of the current North Sea Region Programme period. Under the IIIB Programme 70 transnational co-operation projects were approved.

See also 
 European Commission (EC)
 European Regional Development Fund (ERDF)
 European Union (EU)
 Interreg
 North Sea
 North Sea Commission (NSC)
 North Sea Region (NSR)
 Transnationality

References

External links 
 North Sea Region Programme 2007–2013 Website
 North Sea Programme 2000–2006 Website
 North Sea Region Programme 2007–2013 Programme Leaflet (PDF)
 North Sea Region Programme 2007–2013 Political Leaflet (PDF)

Euroregions
European Commission
North Sea
Transnationalism